This is a list of all natural gas-fired power stations in Canada. There are 39 power stations in operation as of February 2020.

Ontario has the highest number with 12 power stations scattered across the province, followed by Saskatchewan with 10 power stations and Alberta with 9 power stations. The number of natural gas-fired power stations in Alberta is expected to overtake that of all other provinces as coal-fired power stations in the province are converted to running off natural gas.

Natural gas-fired power stations

See also
 List of power stations in Canada by type

Notes

References

External links

 
Natural gas
Canada